The Duke is TV magazine talk show cum lifestyle magazine for men, produced by AXN Asia.

It is hosted by Marc Nelson and Rovilson Fernandez, last seen on the 2nd season of The Amazing Race Asia, and Eunice Olsen, Miss Singapore-Universe 2000 and a nominated member of parliament.

Its première season was launched on February 9, 2009, with 13 episodes.  Each week centers on a topic of discussion with invited guests and an interview with a Duke-of-the-week, intersperse with lifestyle & travel features.

External links
The Duke website
Program schedule

Television talk shows